Emi Meyer (born March 1987) is a Japanese-born, American-raised jazz pianist and singer-songwriter who is based in Seattle and Tokyo and active in both the Japanese and American markets.

Background
Meyer was born in Kyoto, Japan, but grew up in Seattle, Washington, United States. Her mother is Japanese and a professor of art history while her father is American. Meyer began learning classical piano at age six but expanded to Jazz. Meyer attended University Prep, a school in Seattle.

Meyer studied ethnomusicology and international relations at Pomona College in Los Angeles County, including Indian ragas, African drumming and Japanese gagaku (classical court music). She wrote her thesis on the division in the modern Japanese music scene between hogaku (Japanese music) and yogaku (Western music).

She first lived in Japan when she took a study-abroad program in the city of her birth, Kyoto. In 2007, Meyer won the Seattle-Kobe Jazz Vocalist Competition, which kick started her career in Japan.

Professional career
Meyer's 2007 self-produced debut album, Curious Creature reached the No. 1 spot on the iTunes Japan jazz chart after the single "Room Blue" was selected as the Single of the Week. She was already actively performing at events such as the Seattle's Northwest Folklife Festival, the Sundance Film Festival and Kobe Jazz Festival.

Living in Los Angeles, Emi has performed around Hollywood, including: The Hotel Café, The Tangier, and Room 5. In Seattle, she has performed at The Pink Door, Tula's and Dimitrio's Jazz Alley and in New York at the Rockwood Music Hall as well as the 92YTribeca with The Shanghai Restoration Project.

In 2009, Meyer performed as the opening act for Yael Naim's tour in Tokyo and also played at the Fuji Rock Festival.

For her second album Passport, written entirely in Japanese, Meyer teamed up with Japanese rapper and producer Shingo Annen (better known by his stage name Shing02). The record has influences from Brazil, where overdubs were recorded and incorporates bossa nova and reggae.

In 2011, Meyer released her third album Suitcase of Stones, this time in English and described as a mix of "Jazz, blues and reggae-influenced original compositions" and produced by Grammy winning engineer S. Husky Höskulds (Norah Jones, Yael Naim).

Meyer began her 2011 tour of Japan on May 21, as well as performing showcases at Tower Records stores nationwide. She embarked on the tour despite trepidation after fans sent her messages concerned that artists were staying away from Japan following the March 11, 2011 Tōhoku earthquake and tsunami.

In October 2011, Meyer performed two shows in Seattle, including at the Kizuna Benefit Concert to raise funds for victims of the Tōhoku earthquake via charity organization Peace Winds America.

In April 2012, Meyer's all-English EP LOL was released internationally, including "On the Road," recorded for a Toyota Prius commercial.

Meyer released her fifth studio album Galaxy's Skirt in 2013, produced by David Ryan Harris. The music video for the title track was filmed by Canon as a campaign for their 4k Canon EOS C500 camera. Songs from the album have been used in television shows including "Energy" for TV Land's Younger, "On the Road" for MTV's Awkward and "Doin’ Great" on the Brazilian telenovela, Sete Vidas.

Her latest album Monochrome, recorded at Studio Ferber in Paris, was released in Japan on September 2 and debuted at No. 1 on iTunes Japan Jazz. It is scheduled to be released in 2017 on Seattle based jazz label Origin Records, the album will feature original songs for the US market.

On April 14, 2017, the Nappy Roots released the album "Another 40 Akerz". Meyer co-wrote as well as plays piano and sings on the ninth track "Wings ft. Emi Meyer".

Discography

Studio albums
 Curious Creature (2007)
 Passport (2010)
 Suitcase of Stones (2011)
 LOL EP (2012)
 Galaxy's Skirt (2013)
 Emi Meyer & Seiichi Nagai (2014)
 Monochrome (2015)

References

External links 
 Official English website
 Official Japanese website
 Emi Meyer's Twitter
 Emi Meyer's Instagram
 Emi Meyer on Riptide Music 
 Emi Meyer for Empire Artists Japan

Japanese emigrants to the United States
Japanese women singers
1987 births
Living people
American musicians of Japanese descent
American women musicians of Japanese descent
People from Kyoto
Musicians from Kyoto Prefecture
Musicians from Seattle
Japanese women singer-songwriters
Japanese singer-songwriters
Japanese people of American descent
Origin Records artists